Community channel may refer to:

Community television in general
Together TV, a UK television channel formerly known as The Community Channel
Natalie Tran, Australian actress and YouTuber who goes by the online handle "communitychannel"